The Men's individual Gundersen Nordic combined competition for the 2006 Winter Olympics was held in Pragelato, Italy. It took place on 11 February.

Results

Ski Jumping

Fifty athletes entered the ski jumping portion of the sprint; each made two  jumps, which was judged in the same fashion as the Olympic ski jumping competition. The combined scores from these two jumps were used to calculate the deficit with which each athlete began the cross-country portion of the event. Each point behind the leading score of Georg Hettich was equivalent to four seconds of time deficit.

Cross-Country
The start for the 15 kilometre race was staggered, with a one-point deficit in the ski jump portion resulting in a four second deficit in starting the cross-country course. This stagger meant that the first athlete across the finish line, Georg Hettich, was the overall winner of the event. 
Silver medallist Felix Gottwald of Austria and bronze medallist Magnus Moan of Norway both managed to beat Hettich by more than a minute in the cross-country leg, but with  eleventh and ninth place respectively in the ski jumping leg, their cross-country skiing was not enough to take them to the very top of the podium. Moan beat compatriot Petter Tande in a dash for the finish line, while Finn Jaakko Tallus is a further second behind.

References

Nordic combined at the 2006 Winter Olympics